State Road 592 (NM 592) is a  state highway in the US state of New Mexico. NM 592's southern terminus is at Santa Fe County Route 73 (CR 73) (Tesuque Village Road) (former NM 591) northwest of Tesuque, and the northern terminus is at the end of state maintenance in Rio En Medio. NM 592 is not connected to any other state road in the state highway system.

Major intersections

See also

References

592
Transportation in Santa Fe County, New Mexico